Monique Marie Chouraeshkenazi (born November 6, 1983) is an American professor who works at the  Daniel Morgan Graduate School of National Security.  She specializes in homeland and national security. On the faculty at The George Washington University Graduate School of Political Management, she created the nation's first "Ensuring Data Security" course in response to the Russian interference in the 2016 United States elections. Chouraeshkenazi is a former Associate Professor for the School of Security and Global Studies at American Military University. Knowledgeable in advanced scientific terrorism notations and homeland and national security methodologies, Chouraeshkenazi specializes in domestic extremism and global terrorism.

Early life and education 

Chouraeshkenazi attended Pratt Elementary School in Pratt, West Virginia and graduated with honors in 2002 from Riverside High School in Belle, West Virginia. She holds a A.A.S. in Information Resource Management from the Community College of the Air Force, and a B.A. in Homeland Security from American Military University. She earned a Master of Criminal Justice at Boston University, and a career diploma in Private Investigation from Penn Foster College. By 2015, Chouraeshkenazi earned a Ph.D. in Public Policy and Administration with high honors from Walden University, with a concentration in Terrorism, Mediation, and Peace. Her doctoral dissertation was titled, Qualitative Case Study on F-35 Fighter Production Delays affecting National Security Guidance.

Career

Military service 

Chouraeshkenazi is a 13-year military veteran of the U.S. Air Force. She was Chief of the Special Security Office for the 18th Wing Intelligence Unit at Kadena Air Base, Japan;  she served as the Enlisted Military Assistant and Assistant Noncommissioned Officer-in-Charge at The Pentagon, and the Military Executive Assistant for the Joint Improvised Explosive Device Defeat Organization.

Her military honors include two Joint Service Commendation Medals, a Joint Meritorious Medal, two Air Force Commendation Medals, and two Air Force Achievement Medals. Her service and campaign medals include a National Defense Service Medal, Afghanistan Campaign Medal with gold star, Global War on Terrorism Service Medal, Korean Defense Service Medal, Air Force Expeditionary Service Medal with gold border, NATO Service Medal, and Office of Secretary of Defense Badge. She was named Contributor of the Year in the Pacific Air Forces, 5th Air Force and 18th Wing Air Force Intelligence, Surveillance, and Reconnaissance, for her contributions to security and intelligence.

Academic positions 

In 2015, Chouraeshkenazi joined the faculty of the School of Security and Global Studies at American Military University. She also holds adjunct positions at the School of Graduate and Degree Completion at Tiffin University and at Southern New Hampshire University. American Military University and In Homeland Security News featured Chouraeshkenazi in From the Air Force to AMU: A Success Story, highlighting her transition from the military to the classroom. She teaches 25 courses at the undergraduate and graduate levels in criminal justice, diplomacy, homeland/national security, intelligence, international security, legal ethics, political geography, public policy, research, security management, and terrorism. Proficient in national and homeland security matters, Chouraeshkenazi provides programs for universities and professional military development centers.

In March 2019, she became Chair of the National Security Program and Professor of National Security at Daniel Morgan Graduate School of National Security. Chouraeshkenazi oversees the national security division, preparing graduates for positions in National Security agencies and departments, law enforcement organizations, civil governance bodies and corporations. She also oversees the department's budget, curriculum development programs, independent studies, school committees, and student academic advisory programs.

Selected publications 

In January 2018, Chouraeshkenazi published Homeland & National Security: Understanding America's Past to Protect the Future, which identifies overlapping and distinctive responsibilities of the American federal government and how the U.S. Armed Forces protects the homeland, its territories, and resources.

The 32nd United States Deputy Secretary of Defense, Robert O. Work wrote,

In June 2018, Chouraeshkenazi co-edited an anthology with Kyle Kattelman and Francis Boateng, Terrorism: Strategical & Methodological Approaches.

References

External links 

1983 births
Living people
Boston University alumni
Southern New Hampshire University faculty
United States Air Force non-commissioned officers
People from Kanawha County, West Virginia